"Someday" is a song by Canadian rock band Nickelback. It was released on 28 July 2003 as the lead single from their fourth studio album, The Long Road (2003). It reached number one in Canada for three weeks and number seven in the United States. In the latter country, it charted for 50 weeks, thus becoming Nickelback's longest-charting single. It also charted within the top 10 of the UK Singles Chart, where it peaked at number six.

Music video
The music video was directed by Nigel Dick. A version with an alternate ending also exists.

Track listings

Canadian maxi-CD single
 "Someday" (single mix) – 3:25
 "Someday" (album mix) – 3:23
 "Slow Motion" – 3:32

Australian CD single
 "Someday" (album mix)
 "Someday" (acoustic mix)
 "Slow Motion"

European CD single
 "Someday" (single mix) – 3:14
 "Someday" (album mix) – 3:25

European maxi-CD single and Japanese CD single
 "Someday" (single mix) – 3:14
 "Someday" (album mix) – 3:25
 "Slow Motion" – 3:32

UK CD single
 "Someday" (album version) – 3:25
 "Slow Motion" – 3:32
 "Someday" (acoustic version) – 3:23
 "Someday" (video)

Charts

Weekly charts

Year-end charts

Certifications

Release history

References

2000s ballads
2003 singles
2003 songs
Canadian Singles Chart number-one singles
Music videos directed by Nigel Dick
Nickelback songs
Roadrunner Records singles
Rock ballads
Song recordings produced by Joey Moi
Songs written by Chad Kroeger
Songs written by Mike Kroeger
Songs written by Ryan Peake